is a Japanese singer, actor, tarento, and model. He is a member of Hey! Say! JUMP under Johnny & Associates. He was born in Miyagi Prefecture.
 
On December 1, 2002, he entered Johnny & Associates as a trainee. Later, he was put in the junior group Ya-Ya-yah and became the secondary lead vocalist after Kota Yabu. On September 21, 2007, he debuted and began performing as a member of Hey! Say! JUMP. In 2009, he graduated from Horikoshi High School alongside Taiyo Ayukawa and actress Saki Fukuda.

He plays bass guitar in their concerts and even displayed talents in composing and lyrics writing on their first studio album JUMP No. 1.

Discography

Solo 
 "Akogare no Egoist"
 "Gentles"
 "Flame of Love"
 "1000 Lights"
 "Tears and Smile" (Duet with Kota Yabu – Lyrics by Yabu; Composition by Hikaru)
 "Original Iro" (Duet with Yabu)
 "Score" (Hey! Say! BEST song – Lyrics by Yabu; Rap by Hikaru)
 "Infinity" (Lyrics by Hikaru)
 "Ima Susumuo"
 "Ai☆Scream" (Composed and written by Hikaru)
 "Thumb and Pinky" (Lyrics Hikaru)
 "Perfect Life" (Lyrics Hikaru)

Concerts 

 KinKi Kids Dome Concert: Fun Fan Forever (December 31, 2002 – January 1, 2003)
 Johnny's Starship Count Down (December 31, 2002 – January 1, 2003)
 KinKi Kids 24/7 G Tour (December 31, 2002 – January 1, 2003)
 2003 Concert Tour To be, To be, Ten made Ten made To be (March 29 – May 5, 2003)
 Kotoshi mo Ah Taihen Thank U Natsu (August 8–28, 2003)
 KAT-TUN no Daibouken de Show (August 12–20, 2003)
 NEWS Taiwan Concert (October 10, 2003)
 A Happy NEWS Year 2004 (January 1–4, 2004)
 2004 Concert Tour TackeyTsuba 22sai Kon (July 4, 2004)
 Johnny's Theater "Summary" of Johnnys World (August 8–29, 2004)
 Tsubasa Con (August 18–25, 2004)
 Shinen so-soh Kinpachi Trio Ya-Ya-yah Concert (January 2, 2005)
 Ya-Ya-yah Haruyasumi Yokohama Arena Concert (March 26, 2005)
 Johnny's Theater Summary Digest 2005 (July 29 – September 4, 2005)
 Johnny's Junior no Daibouken! (August 15–26, 2006)
 Youtachi no Ongaku Daiundokai (September 30 – October 1, 2006)
 2007nen Kingashinnen Akemashite Omedetou Johnny's Jr. Daishugou (January 1–7, 2007)
 Johnny's Jr.no Daibouken! @Meridian (August 15–24, 2007)
 Johnny'S Jr. Hey Say '07 in Tokyo Dome (September 23–24, 2007)

Filmography

Dramas 
 3nen BGumi Kinpachi Sensei 7th Series (October 2004 – March 2005) as Maruyama Shu
 3nen BGumi Kinpachi Sensei 7th Series Ma no Saishuukai Special (December 30, 2005) as Maruyama Shu
 Orthros no Inu (TBS, 2009) as Kumakiri Masaru
 3nen BGumi Kinpachi Sensei Final as Maruyama Shu (March 2011)
 Ikemen desu ne (TBS, July 2011) as Hongo Yuuki
 37-sai de Isha ni Natta Boku: Kenshui Junjo Monogatari (Fuji TV, 2012) as Kentaro Shimoda
 Dark System Koi no Ouza Ketteisen (TBS, 2014)
 Do S Deka as Sōichirō Hamada (NTV, 2015)
 Koshoku Robot (NTV, 2017) as Ottori

Variety shows 
 The Shōnen Club (2003–present)
 Ya-Ya-yah (January 2003 – October 2007)
 Hyakushiki (2007–2008)
 Hi! Hey! Say! (November 2007–present)
 School Kakumei! (April 2009–present, NTV)
 YY JUMPing (October 2009–present)
 Yan Yan JUMP (April 2011–present)
 Hirunandesu! (2014–present)
 Itadaki High JUMP (2015–present, Fuji TV)

TV appearances 
 Gurunai (with Daiki Arioka, NTV, August 5, 2010)
 Waratte Iitomo! (with Kota Yabu and Daiki Arioka, Fuji TV, December 15, 2010)
 Merengue no Kimochi (NTV, December 18, 2010)
 Unlucky Laboratory (NTV, January 4, 2011)
 Otameshika program (December 26, 2011)
 SMAP x SMAP (June 4, 2012)

Theatre 
 Stand by Me (July 25 – August 10, 2003)
 Stand by Me (July 16 – August 1, 2004)
 DREAM BOYS

TV Commercials / Advertisements 
 Pizza-la Super Bingo Hen (2003)
 Maruchan Akai Kitsune no Tanuki (TU→YU)
 Maruchan Akai Kitsune no Tanuki
 Deca Sports – Wii (2009)
 OZACK

References

External links 
 Hey! Say! JUMP
 Johnny's-net

Johnny & Associates
Living people
Japanese male pop singers
Japanese idols
People from Miyagi Prefecture
Hey! Say! JUMP members
1990 births
Musicians from Miyagi Prefecture
Actors from Miyagi Prefecture
Horikoshi High School alumni
21st-century Japanese male actors
21st-century Japanese singers
21st-century Japanese male singers